Daniel Keller (born February 7, 1992) is an American professional soccer player who plays as a defender.

Career

Youth
Keller played four years of college soccer at the University of Louisville between 2011 and 2014.

While at college, Keller appeared for USL PDL side Chicago Fire U-23 in 2012, 2013 and 2014.

Professional
On January 21, 2015, Keller was selected 62nd overall in the 2015 MLS SuperDraft by LA Galaxy.

Keller signed for North American Soccer League side Indy Eleven on May 11, 2015.

References

External links
 Indy Eleven Profile .

1992 births
Living people
American soccer players
Association football defenders
Chicago Fire U-23 players
LA Galaxy draft picks
Louisville Cardinals men's soccer players
Indy Eleven players
North American Soccer League players
People from Carmel, Indiana
Soccer players from Indiana
USL League Two players